Tomáš Pajonk (born 11 August 1981 in Havířov) is a Czech politician and businessman. He was the leader of the Party of Free Citizens.

Biography
Pajonk was born in 1981. He studied at the University of Economics, Prague. He later started his own business, and in 2012 he joined Party of Free Citizens. He soon became the leader of the party's Zlín regional branch. He stood in the 2016 regional election and became a member of the Zlín regional assembly.

Pajonk ran for party's leadership in November 2017. He received over 50% of votes and defeated the incumbent leader Petr Mach.

References

External links 

 

Czech libertarians
People from Havířov
1981 births
Living people
Prague University of Economics and Business alumni
Leaders of Svobodní